Tupu Inka (Aymara and Quechua tupu general word for measure / Incan measurement for a certain distance, Quechua tupu brooch, Inka Inca) is an archaeological site in Peru. It is located in the Puno Region, Yunguyo Province, Unicachi District.

References

Archaeological sites in Puno Region
Archaeological sites in Peru